This is a list of active and extinct volcanoes in Cape Verde.

References

Cape Verde
 
Volcanoes